Zev may refer to:

People and fictional characters
Ze'ev, also spelt Zev, a given name and surname (including a list of people with the name)
Zev, variant of the name of Jebe, a general of Genghis Khan
Z'EV (1951–2017), American musician
Zev Bellringer, fictional character in the television series Lexx
Zev Senesca, fictional character in the 1980 film The Empire Strikes Back

Other uses 
Zev (horse)
Z Electric Vehicle, a company in West Virginia
Zero-emissions vehicle, a vehicle that doesn't emit any greenhouse gases from itself or from the source or energy production.

See also
Zeb (disambiguation)